The 2004 SEC softball tournament was held at the University of Alabama Softball Stadium on the campus of the University of Alabama in Tuscaloosa, Alabama, from May 13 through May 16, 2004.  LSU won the tournament and earned the Southeastern Conference's automatic bid to the NCAA tournament.

Tournament

Ole Miss, Kentucky and Arkansas did not make the tournament.  Vanderbilt does not sponsor a softball team.

All-Tournament Team
P - Kristin Schmidt, LSU
P - Kasi Carroll, Georgia
C - Shannon McKeon, Georgia
1B - Jackie McClain, Alabama
2B - Megan McAllister, Georgia
3B - Jade Jarvis, Georgia
SS - Lindsey Schutzler, Tennessee
OF - Iyhia McMichael, Mississippi State
OF - Sara Fekete, Tennessee
OF - Leslie Klein, LSU
DP - Paige Jones, Auburn
SEC Tournament MVP: Kristin Schmidt, LSU, Pitcher

See also
Women's College World Series
NCAA Division I Softball Championship
SEC Tournament

References

SEC softball tournament
2004 Southeastern Conference softball season